The 2015 FIFA Women's World Cup qualification UEFA Group 6 was a UEFA qualifying group for the 2015 FIFA Women's World Cup. The group comprised Belarus, England, Montenegro, Turkey, Ukraine and Wales.

The group winners qualified directly for the 2015 FIFA Women's World Cup. Among the seven group runners-up, the four best (determined by records against the first-, third-, fourth- and fifth-placed teams only for balance between different groups) advanced to the play-offs.

England qualified for its third consecutive World Cup on 21 August 2014 after winning 4–0 against Wales.

Standings

Results
All times are CEST (UTC+02:00) during summer and CET (UTC+01:00) during winter.

Game was originally scheduled for 5 April 2014 but moved back due to the 2014 Ukrainian revolution.

Goalscorers
13 goals
 Eniola Aluko

10 goals
 Toni Duggan

7 goals
 Karen Carney
 Oksana Yakovyshyn

6 goals

 Olha Boychenko
 Vira Dyatel
 Tetyana Romanenko
 Jess Fishlock

5 goals

 Natasha Dowie
 Yağmur Uraz
 Natasha Harding

4 goals
 Liana Mirashnichenka
 Anna Pilipenko

3 goals

 Ellen White
 Fatma Kara
 Daryna Apanaschenko
 Lyudmyla Pekur
 Helen Ward
 Sarah Wiltshire

2 goals

 Lucy Bronze
 Jordan Nobbs
 Lianne Sanderson
 Sladjana Bulatović
 Ivana Krivokapić
 Marija Vukčević
 Olha Ovdiychuk

1 goal

 Ekaterina Avkhimovich
 Julia Borisenko
 Anastasiya Kharlanova
 Anna Kozyupa
 Laura Bassett
 Alex Greenwood
 Steph Houghton
 Josanne Potter
 Jill Scott
 Casey Stoney
 Demi Stokes
 Fara Williams
 Sevgi Çınar
 Sibel Duman
 Arzu Karabulut
 Ebru Topçu
 Valeria Aleshicheva
 Daryna Apanaschenko
 Hannah Keryakoplis

1 own goal
 Jovana Mrkić (playing against Ukraine)

References

External links
Women's World Cup – Qualifying round Group 6, UEFA.com

Group 6
2013 in Belarusian football
2014 in Belarusian football
2013–14 in English women's football
qual
2013–14 in Montenegrin football
2014–15 in Montenegrin football
2013–14 in Turkish football
2014–15 in Turkish football
2013–14 in Welsh women's football
2014–15 in Welsh women's football
2013–14 in Ukrainian football
2014–15 in Ukrainian football